The IRB under-19 Rugby World Cup was the premier tournament for male rugby union players under the age of 19 organised by the sports governing body the International Rugby Board (IRB) annually from 2004 until 2007. Both it and the Under 21 Rugby World Championship were replaced by the IRB Junior World Championship for under-20 players which started in 2008.

Format 
Twenty-four teams took part in each tournament. They were placed into two divisions (A and B) based on rankings. Each division was split into four pools (labeled A-D) of three according to their past performance. Each team played three matches against three teams of a specific pool (i.e. pool A played against pool D and pool B played against pool C). Four points were awarded for a win, two for a draw, and none for a loss. One bonus point was awarded for scoring 4 tries or more, and one bonus point was awarded for loss by 7 points or less.

After all the pool matches, the teams were ranked by total match points. The top four teams qualified for the semifinals (1st against 4th and 2nd against 3rd). Similarly, other teams entered play-offs for positions 5-8 and 9-12.

The winning semi-finalists met in the final and the losing semi-finalists played to decide third place. The division A winning team won the tournament outright and the division B winning team earned the right to move up to division A the following year at the expense of the team which came 12th in division A, which fell to division B.

Results 

Notes

External links
 IRB U19 Home Page
 Worldcup Schedule

World Rugby Under 20 Championship
Defunct rugby union competitions for national teams